Bretuo is one of the eight major Akan clans.

Totem
The totem of the Bretuo people is the leopard

Major towns
Some of the towns which have a Bretuo family member as chief include;Jamasi, Apaa, Ofoase, Brodekwano and Beposo at Bosomtwe district etc.

References

Akan people